Noel or Noël Martin may refer to:

Noël Martin (1959–2020), British assisted suicide activist
Noel Martin (1922–2009), American graphic designer
Noel Martin (British Army officer) (1892–1985), British Army officer